Allan P. Siebert (born 1942) is an American bridge player from Little Rock, Arkansas. On April 18, 2022 he was suspended by the American Contract Bridge League pending a disciplinary hearing. One of his online partners was suspended the same day.

Bridge accomplishments

Wins

 North American Bridge Championships (6)
 von Zedtwitz Life Master Pairs (1) 1995 
 Leventritt Silver Ribbon Pairs (1) 2007 
 Truscott Senior Swiss Teams (1) 2001 
 Senior Knockout Teams (1) 2001 
 Keohane North American Swiss Teams (2) 1988, 2003

Runners-up

 North American Bridge Championships
 von Zedtwitz Life Master Pairs (1) 1985 
 Leventritt Silver Ribbon Pairs (1) 2014 
 Truscott Senior Swiss Teams (2) 1999, 2002 
 Senior Knockout Teams (2) 2005, 2007

Notes

External links
 

Living people
American contract bridge players
Place of birth missing (living people)
1942 births
Date of birth missing (living people)
Sportspeople from Little Rock, Arkansas